In nuclear physics, the chiral model, introduced by Feza Gürsey in 1960, is a phenomenological model describing effective interactions of mesons in the chiral limit (where the masses of the quarks go to zero), but without necessarily mentioning quarks at all. It is a nonlinear sigma model with the principal homogeneous space of the Lie group SU(N) as its target manifold, where N is the number of quark flavors. The Riemannian metric of the target manifold is given by a positive constant multiplied by the Killing form acting upon the Maurer–Cartan form of SU(N). 

The internal global symmetry of this model is SU(N)L × SU(N)R, the left and right copies, respectively; where the left copy acts as the left action upon the target space, and the right copy acts as the right action. The left copy represents flavor rotations among the left-handed quarks, while the right copy describes rotations among the right-handed quarks, while these, L and R, are completely independent of each other. The axial pieces of these symmetries are spontaneously broken so that the corresponding scalar fields are the requisite Nambu−Goldstone bosons.

This model admits topological solitons called skyrmions.

Departures from exact chiral symmetry are dealt with in chiral perturbation theory.

An outline of the original, 2-flavor model
The chiral model of Gürsey (1960; also see Gell-Mann and Lévy) is now appreciated to be an effective theory of QCD with two light quarks, u, and d. The QCD Lagrangian is approximately invariant under independent global flavor rotations of the left- and right-handed quark fields,

where τ denote the Pauli matrices in the flavor space and θL, θR are the corresponding rotation angles. 

The corresponding symmetry group  is the chiral group, controlled by the six conserved currents 

which can equally well be expressed in terms of the vector and axial-vector currents 

The corresponding conserved charges generate the algebra of the chiral group,

with I=L,R, or, equivalently, 

Application of these commutation relations to hadronic reactions dominated current algebra calculations in the early seventies of the last century.

That is, it is realized nonlinearly, in the Nambu–Goldstone mode: The QV annihilate the vacuum, but the QA do not!
 
To construct a non-linear realization of SO(4), the representation describing four-dimensional rotations of a vector 
 
for an infinitesimal rotation parametrized by six angles 

is given by

where 

The four real quantities  define the smallest nontrivial chiral multiplet and represent the field content of the linear sigma model. 

These three independent components 

with F a (pion decay) constant of dimension mass. 

Utilizing this to eliminate   yields the following transformation properties of   under SO(4),

The nonlinear terms (shifting  ) on the right-hand side of the second equation underlie the nonlinear realization of SO(4). The chiral group  is realized nonlinearly on the triplet of pions— which, however, still transform linearly under isospin  rotations parametrized through the angles   By contrast, the   represent the nonlinear "shifts" (spontaneous breaking).

Through the spinor map, these four-dimensional rotations of   can also be conveniently written using 2×2 matrix notation by introducing the unitary matrix 
 
and requiring the transformation properties of U under chiral rotations to be
 
where 

The transition to the nonlinear realization follows,
 
where  denotes the trace in the flavor space. This is a non-linear sigma model.

The constant F2/4 is chosen in such a way that the Lagrangian matches the usual free term for massless scalar fields when written in terms of the pions,

Alternate Parametrization
An alternative, equivalent (Gürsey, 1960), parameterization 

yields a simpler expression for U,

Note the reparameterized  transform under 
 
so, then, manifestly identically to the above under isorotations, ; and similarly to the above, as 
 
under the broken symmetries, the shifts. This simpler expression generalizes readily (Cronin, 1967) to  light quarks, so

References

 
; 
Georgi, H. (1984, 2009). Weak Interactions and Modern Particle Theory (Dover Books on Physics)  online .

Quantum field theory
Quantum chromodynamics
Nuclear physics